Orbigny-au-Mont is a commune in the Haute-Marne department, northeastern France.

See also
Communes of the Haute-Marne department

References

Orbignyaumont